Let's Do It Again is the Curtis Mayfield-penned and Staple Singers-performed soundtrack to the highly successful 1975 comedy film starring Sidney Poitier, Bill Cosby and Jimmie Walker. The title track hit number one on both the R&B and pop charts in the US. Gil Askey and Rich Tufo were responsible for the arrangements.

Track listing
All tracks composed by Curtis Mayfield, except where indicated.
"Let's Do It Again"
"Funky Love"
"A Whole Lot of Love"
"New Orleans"
"I Want to Thank You"
"Big Mac"
"After Sex"
"Chase" (Quinton Joseph, Philip Upchurch, Gary Thompson, Floyd Morris, Joseph Scott, Mayfield)

Personnel
Floyd Morris, Rich Tufo - keyboards
Curtis Mayfield, Gary Thompson, Phil Upchurch - guitars
Quintin Joseph - drums 
Henry Gibson - congas , bongos
 Lucky Scott - bass

See also
List of number-one R&B albums of 1975 (U.S.)

References

The Staple Singers albums
Collaborative albums
Curtis Mayfield soundtracks
1975 soundtrack albums
Comedy film soundtracks
Albums produced by Curtis Mayfield
Curtom Records albums
Soul soundtracks
Funk soundtracks